Mansion House on Kawau Island, New Zealand, is a house that was owned by Sir George Grey from 1862 to 1888. Built in 1845 as the house for the manager of a copper mine on the island, it was extended significantly by Grey during his ownership. Mansion House is a heritage listed building. It is open to the public as part of the Kawau Island Historic Reserve administered by the Department of Conservation.

Background
It was occupied by Māori up until sometime in the 19th century and in 1839 was purchased by a land company intending to avail itself of the island's timber. In 1844, copper deposits were discovered and mining infrastructure was quickly established. However, the efforts to extract the copper was plagued with flooding of mine shafts and workers left to go gold mining in Australia. The copper mine on Kawau Island closed in 1855, after around  had been extracted. The island was put up for sale in 1862 at which time Sir George Grey, newly commencing a second term as Governor of New Zealand, purchased it for £3,500.

Mansion House
In 1845, the manager of the mine, Captain James Ninnis, had a two level brick dwelling of 11 rooms built at Momona Bay (what is now called Mansion House Bay). When Grey purchased the island, he was impressed with the building, commenting favourably on its thick walls, kauri timber and surrounding landscape. He contracted the architect Frederick Thatcher to extend the house with additional bedrooms, as well as dining and drawing rooms. Thatcher maintained the original Georgian style of the house, designing a new wing with an elongate verandah and bay window. The work was completed by an Auckland builder for £5,000. 

Grey lived in the house from 1870 to 1874 and then used it as a getaway. For much of this time, his niece also resided at Mansion House. He spent extravagantly on the property, filling the house with artifacts from around the world and importing rare plant and animal species for his gardens. In 1888, his health now in decline, Grey sold the island. 

The new owners added the distinctive verandahs, designed by the architect Robert Watt, to the front face of the house and by 1901, it had become known as Mansion House. Over the next several decades, much of the surrounding land was subdivided and the house itself had several owners. The island was a popular destination for tourists and day trippers from Auckland and for much of this time, Mansion House was operated as a hotel.

In 1967, the last owner sold the house and surrounding land to the New Zealand Government so that it may be included in the newly established Hauraki Gulf Maritime Park. Mansion House continued to be operated as a hotel under a lease and was subject to some alterations that were not in keeping with the character of the building. In 1977, the lease was surrendered and the house underwent extensive renovations to bring it back to how it appeared in the 1890s. Furnished and decorated with loaned or donated period pieces, Mansion House was opened to the public in October 1979.

Mansion House was registered by the New Zealand Historic Places Trust (now called Heritage New Zealand) on 23 June 1983 and has registration number 8. The building has a category I listing. It is administered by the Department of Conservation as part of the Kawau Island Historic Reserve.

Notes

References

Frederick Thatcher buildings
Houses completed in 1845
Kawau Island
Heritage New Zealand Category 1 historic places in the Auckland Region
1840s architecture in New Zealand